Viktor Ivanovich Rashchupkin (born October 16, 1950) was a Soviet/Russian athlete who competed mainly in the discus throw. He was born in Kamensk-Uralsky.

He competed for Soviet Union at the 1980 Summer Olympics held in Moscow, Soviet Union where he won the gold medal in the men's discus throw event.

With the death of Al Oerter on 1 October 2007, Rashchupkin is now the oldest surviving Olympic Champion in the Men's Discus. He is almost exactly 1 month older than 1976 Champion, Mac Wilkins.

References

1950 births
Living people
Soviet male discus throwers
Russian male discus throwers
Olympic gold medalists for the Soviet Union
Athletes (track and field) at the 1980 Summer Olympics
Olympic athletes of the Soviet Union
Medalists at the 1980 Summer Olympics
Olympic gold medalists in athletics (track and field)
People from Kamensk-Uralsky
Sportspeople from Sverdlovsk Oblast